Gavambodhi (pronounced gavāmbōdhi, meanin The teacher of the cows) is a ragam in Carnatic music (musical scale of South Indian classical music). It is the 43rd Melakarta rāgam in the 72 melakarta rāgam system of Carnatic music.

Structure and Lakshana

It is the 1st rāgam in the 8th chakra Vasu. The mnemonic name is Vasu-Pa. The mnemonic phrase is sa ra gi mi pa dha na. Its  structure (ascending and descending scale) is as follows (see swaras in Carnatic music for details on below notation and terms):
: 
: 
(the notes used in this scale are shuddha rishabham, sadharana gandharam, prati madhyamam, shuddha dhaivatham, shuddha nishadham)

As it is a melakarta rāgam, by definition it is a sampoorna rāgam (has all seven notes in ascending and descending scale). It is the prati madhyamam equivalent of Senavati, which is the 7th melakarta.

Janya rāgams 
Gavambodhi has a few minor janya rāgams (derived scales) associated with it. See List of janya rāgams for all janya rāgams associated with Gavambodhi.

Compositions
A few compositions set to Gavambodhi are:

Virai vagave by Koteeswara Iyer
Vinati chakonavayya by Dr. M. Balamuralikrishna
Namomasti geervani by Muthuswami Dikshitar

Related rāgams
This section covers the theoretical and scientific aspect of this rāgam.

Gavambodhi's notes when shifted using Graha bhedam, yields a minor melakarta rāgam Hatakambari. Graha bhedam is the step taken in keeping the relative note frequencies same, while shifting the shadjam to the next note in the rāgam. For further details and an illustration refer Graha bhedam on Hatakambari.

Notes

References

Melakarta ragas